Robert Zepp McCarthy (born 21 November 1948) is an English retired footballer. Originally from Lyndhurst, Hampshire, McCarthy played the majority of his professional career with Football League club Southampton, before finishing his short career with brief spells at Poole Town, Cowes Sports, and Andover. McCarthy played primarily as a right-back.

Playing career
Originally from the New Forest area, McCarthy grew up a fan of Southampton and is said to have wanted to join the club since he was a youngster. After playing his youth football with a number of local schools, McCarthy joined the Saints in October 1963 and signed his first professional deal with the club in November 1965; he did not make his senior debut until two years later, against Sunderland on 25 November 1967.

With Joe Kirkup the first choice at right-back, McCarthy struggled to break into the first team until the 1971–72 season, when he began to establish himself in the position and became the first choice. After Southampton's relegation to the Second Division in 1974, McCarthy struggled to regain his top form due to an operation on his knee, and after making only 16 league appearances in the 1974–75 season he decided to retire from the professional game at age 26. McCarthy spent a few seasons playing for local non-league clubs Poole Town, Cowes Sports, and Andover before retiring from football entirely.

In total, McCarthy made nearly 300 appearances for the Southampton senior and reserve teams combined, with club legend Terry Paine naming him in his choice for the Saints 'dream team' of his era.

Career statistics

References

1948 births
Living people
People from Lyndhurst, Hampshire
English footballers
Association football fullbacks
Southampton F.C. players
Poole Town F.C. players
Cowes Sports F.C. players
Andover F.C. players
English Football League players